RFA Darkdale was a Dale-class fleet tanker of the Royal Fleet Auxiliary (RFA), launched on 23 July 1940 as Empire Oil, completed in November 1940 and transferred to the RFA as Darkdale. She was sunk during the Second World War on 22 October 1941 by the German submarine . Her wreck in James Bay off Jamestown, Saint Helena continued to leak oil, posing a potential environmental threat to the coastal waters of Saint Helena, until Ministry of Defence divers drained the ship's tanks in 2015.

Description
The ship was powered by a four-stroke single cycle single acting diesel engine which had six cylinders of 29 inches diameter by 59 inches stroke. The engine was built by J G Kincaid & Co Ltd, Greenock, Renfrewshire. As RFA Darkdale, her armament comprised a 4.7-inch gun, a 12-pounder gun, two "pig trough" rocket launchers, two Hotchkiss machine guns, two Marlin machine guns and two Lewis guns with parachute and cable rockets.

History
Empire Oil was built by Blythswood Shipbuilding Company of Scotstoun, Glasgow. She was laid down in October 1939, launched on 23 July 1940, completed in November 1940. Built for the Ministry of Shipping, her port of registry was Glasgow. The United Kingdom Official Number 165991 was allocated. Empire Oil was subsequently transferred to the Royal Fleet Auxiliary as RFA Darkdale.

In August 1941 she arrived at Saint Helena, as fleet oiler for the South Atlantic and refuelled a number of Royal Navy ships there including the cruiser  and the aircraft carrier . At anchor in James Bay in the early hours of 22 October 1941, she was struck by four torpedoes from the German submarine , commanded by Karl-Friedrich Merten, broke in two and sank. Forty-one men were lost and two men on deck were blown clear and survived. Seven men, including the captain, were ashore. The lost crew are commemorated on the Cenotaph at Jamestown and at the Tower Hill Memorial in London.

The wreck leaked fuel oil, posing a potential environmental threat to the coastal waters of Saint Helena. In April 2012 a team from Salvage and Marine Operations, an arm of the Defence Equipment and Support organisation Ministry of Defence (MOD), left for Saint Helena to examine the wreck. The ice patrol ship  surveyed it in October 2012 to provide additional sonar imagery. In 2015, Salvage and Marine Operations divers drained  of oil from the ship's tanks. Royal Navy divers also removed 38 shells from the two main guns.

References

1940 ships
Ships built on the River Clyde
Empire ships
Dale-class oilers
Tankers of the Royal Fleet Auxiliary
World War II shipwrecks in the South Atlantic
Ships sunk by German submarines in World War II
Maritime incidents in October 1941
History of Saint Helena
Saint Helena and Dependencies in World War II